Sigvald Svendsen (3 October 1895 – 31 January 1956) was a Norwegian politician for the Liberal Party.

Biography
He served as a deputy representative to the Norwegian Parliament from Vest-Agder during the term 1950–1953 and 1954–1957. He died shortly before the end of the second term.

References

1895 births
1956 deaths
Liberal Party (Norway) politicians
Deputy members of the Storting